Kris Schildermans (born 8 April 1984 in Neerpelt) is a Belgian long track speed skater who participates in international competitions.

By 11 January 2009, Schildermans was placed 262nd on the Adelskalender, the ranking list of all-time personal bests.

Achievements
European Speed Skating Championships for Men (3 participations):
 2007, 2008, 2009
 Best result 28th in 2008

Personal records

References

External links
Official website
Schildermans at Jakub Majerski's Speedskating Database
Schildermans at SkateResults.com
DESG

1984 births
Living people
Belgian male speed skaters
People from Neerpelt
Sportspeople from Limburg (Belgium)
21st-century Belgian people